Stephen Cobb may refer to:

 Stephen A. Cobb (1833–1878), U.S. Representative from Kansas
 Stephen T. Cobb (born 1952), expert on security, privacy, and related topics
 Stephen Cobb (judge) (born 1962), British judge